Prince Philipp of Liechtenstein (Philipp Erasmus Alois Ferdinand Maria Sebaldus; born 19 August 1946) is a member of the princely family of Liechtenstein. He is a son of the late Franz Joseph II and the younger brother of current reigning prince Hans-Adam II.

Biography 
Prince Philipp was born in Zürich as the second son of Franz Joseph II, Prince of Liechtenstein and his wife, Countess Georgina of Wilczek.

Prince Philipp studied history and sociology at the University of Bonn and the University of Basel. He has been a member of the board of directors of the LGT group since 1981, and the chairman of that organisation since 2001.

Marriage and family
He married Isabelle de l'Arbre de Malander (b. 24 November 1949 in Ronse, Belgium) on 11 September 1971, daughter of Jean-Baptiste de l'Arbre de Malander and wife Guillemette Grassal. They have three sons and have had four grandchildren:
Prince Alexander Wilhelm Hans Adam of Liechtenstein (born on 19 May 1972 in Basel, Canton of Basel-Stadt, Switzerland). Married civilly in Vaduz on 24 January 2003 and religiously in Salzburg on 8 February 2003 to Astrid Barbara Kohl (born on 13 September 1968 in Regensburg, Germany), daughter of Theodor Kohl and wife Ingrid Schlechta.  They have one daughter:
Princess Theodora Alexandra Isabella Antonia Nora Marie of Liechtenstein (born on 20 November 2004 in Chêne-Bougeries, Canton of Geneva, Switzerland). Raised in Italy, she read architecture at St John's College, University of Cambridge. She founded the Green Teen Team Foundation, an environmental foundation, in 2014. Princess Theodora is an ambassador for Project 0, a charity focuses on protecting the ocean from plastic pollution. She won the first place of both individual and team test at the 2022 Junior Grand Prix Dressage competition. She also visited Romania and Seychelles on behalf of her foundation.
 Prince Wenzeslaus of Liechtenstein (born on 12 May 1974 in Uccle, Brussels, Belgium). From 2003 to 2006, he dated Brazilian model Adriana Lima.
 Prince Rudolf Ferdinand of Liechtenstein (born on 7 September 1975 in Uccle, Brussels, Belgium). Married in Istanbul on 20 April 2012 to İlhan Tılsım Tanberk, a Turkish businesswoman and heiress of the Sinter Metal company. She was born on 20 July 1974 in Istanbul, Turkey as a daughter of Olgun Tanberk and wife Melek Kampulat. They have three children: 
Princess Alienor Faye of Liechtenstein (Turkish: Alya Nur, 29 September 2014 – 13 December 2015).
Princess Laetitia of Liechtenstein (born on 21 July 2016 in Zurich, Canton of Zürich, Switzerland). Twin of Prince Karl Ludwig.
Prince Karl Ludwig of Liechtenstein (born on 21 July 2016 in Zurich, Canton of Zürich, Switzerland). Twin of Princess Laetitia.

Honours

National honours
 : Grand Star of the Order of Merit of the Principality of Liechtenstein, 1st Class
 : Recipient of the 70th Birthday Medal of Prince Franz Joseph II

References 

Liechtenstein bankers
Princes of Liechtenstein
1946 births
Living people
Liechtenstein Roman Catholics
Sons of monarchs